InnoTech College is a provincially accredited private college in Alberta, Canada, that trains students to become software developers, specializing in Web Development. It was established in 2015 and has campuses in Calgary, Alberta and Edmonton, Alberta.

Accreditation 
InnoTech College is licensed and designated in Alberta, under the Private Vocational Training Act. Its Provincial Educational Institution Codes are BPOS (Calgary) and BPPE (Edmonton). A list of all Alberta's licensed institutions can be found at Alberta Learning Information Service School Directory.

Calgary Campus 
The Calgary Campus and Head Office is located on the third floor of the Atrium Square. It is located at 305 - 4014 MacLeod Trail SE, Calgary, Alberta and is located one block West of the 39th Avenue LRT station.

Edmonton Campus 
The Edmonton Campus is located at 209 - 10080 Jasper Ave, Edmonton, Alberta and is connected to the Central LRT station.

See also 
List of colleges in Alberta
Education in Alberta

References 

Colleges in Alberta
Schools in Alberta